Roar of the Crowd is a 1953 American sports film directed by William Beaudine and starring Howard Duff, Helene Stanley and Dave Willock. A number of racing drivers appears as themselves. The film was shot in cinecolor.

Plot
An aspiring young racing driver is injured in his first Indianapolis 500, and is persuaded by his fiancée to give up the sport. But she eventually has a change of heart, permitting him to make a comeback.

Partial cast
 Howard Duff as Johnny Tracy 
 Helene Stanley as Marcy Parker 
 Dave Willock as Buster Sands 
 Louise Arthur as Rose Adams 
 Minor Watson as Cyrus Mackey 
 Harry Shannon as Sam 'Pop' Tracy 
 Don Haggerty as Chuck Baylor 
 Edna Holland as Mrs. Atkinson 
 Ray Walker as Tuffy Adams 
 Paul Bryar as Max Bromski
 Larry Thor as an announcer.

References

Bibliography
 Martin, Len D. The Allied Artists Checklist: The Feature Films and Short Subjects of Allied Artists Pictures Corporation, 1947-1978. McFarland & Company, 1993.

External links

1953 films
American sports drama films
1953 drama films
1950s sports drama films
1950s English-language films
Films directed by William Beaudine
American auto racing films
Monogram Pictures films
Cinecolor films
1950s American films